Just Dance 2016 is a 2015 dance video game developed and published by Ubisoft. Unveiled on June 15, 2015, during its E3 press conference as the seventh main installment of the 
series, it was released in October 2015 for PlayStation 3, PlayStation 4, Xbox 360, Xbox One, Wii, and Wii U.

The game notably placed an emphasis on the use of a smartphone mobile app for motion detection, and introduced a subscription-based service which offers streaming access to a back catalogue of songs from previous entries in the franchise, as well as additional content that is exclusive to the service.

Gameplay

As with previous installments, players select a song, and then follow the motions of on-screen dancer(s) and their choreographed routine. Players are judged on a ranking scale for the accuracy of each of their moves in comparison to that of the on-screen dancer. The game supports the use of each console's motion controller accessories (Kinect on Xbox 360 and One, PlayStation Camera on PS4, PlayStation Move on PS3 and PS4, and Wii Remotes on Wii and Wii U); alternatively, players can utilize a smartphone app for motion tracking.

Standard gameplay has been re-organized under the banner of "Dance Party" mode—encompassing competitive and co-operative multiplayer modes, with co-op  mode allowing players to earn jewels as a team, with up to 10 jewels for either a four, five, or six person team, and the ability to send recordings of performances alongside challenges to other players. In the "Dance Quests" mode, players compete against a computer opponent across three randomly selected songs. Versions for eighth-generation consoles also include "Showtime", which allows players to record short lip sync music videos to songs with themed visual effects.

While the Wii, PS3, and Xbox 360 versions of the game are based on Just Dance 2015, all of the online features from that said game, including the "challenge" feature, the "Just Dance Wall" feature, and the "World Dance Floor", made a return. The "Community Remix" feature, returning from Just Dance 2015, was revamped with player videos being added into the background of the original choreography, excluding "Uptown Funk", in a full screen format instead of the windowed format, with the latter format still being used in the Wii, PS3, and Xbox 360 versions of the game. Mashups now use the remade versions of the routines shown in the first three main games in the Just Dance series, first shown in Just Dance Now, unlike the pictures of coaches using the original designs from these games being remade in Just Dance 2015.

All online services for the Wii, PS3, and Xbox 360 versions of the game were discontinued on November 19, 2018.

Soundtrack
The following songs appear on Just Dance 2016:

Just Dance Unlimited
Versions of the game on eighth-generation consoles support Just Dance Unlimited, which offers subscription-based access to a streaming library of songs from previous Just Dance games, and new songs that are exclusive to the service. Ubisoft stated that the service would offer at least 150 songs on-launch. A three-month subscription to Just Dance Unlimited is included as part of a higher-priced version of Just Dance 2016 known as the "Gold Edition".

Songs exclusive to this service include:

Reception 
Steve Hannley of Hardcore Gamer criticised Just Dance 2016 for its lack of differentiation from previous versions, especially for a franchise described as having reached "Guitar Hero levels of saturation". Although the Dance Quest mode was partially praised for being a new feature at all, it was declared redundant to manually picking three songs to play in a row, and all of the new modes in 2016 were panned for being "glorified ways to play the game in exactly the same way". The soundtrack was considered to be worse than that of Just Dance 2015 (which he had previously described as having the worst in series history), citing "terrible" songs, lacking "underground" electronic dance music, and containing too many older songs (noting that only 8 of the 44 on-disc songs were released within the year). The Just Dance Now service was speculated as being the potential future of the franchise, noting that "at $39.99 a year (or the insane $6.99 a month), it's priced just under the cost of the game at retail and considering the gameplay hasn't changed the past three years, it makes sense to simply phase this in as the complete replacement of annual releases." In conclusion, Hannley gave Just Dance 2016 a 2.5 out of 5, concluding that "while the core gameplay remains fun despite some questionable choreography, the overall package reeks of complete and utter apathy. Basic Kinect features have been stripped, there's an unnecessary focus on smartphone use and only eight licensed songs of the over forty included in total are from this year, which is a huge issue considering that the series has devolved into a glorified track pack."

Awards

References

External links

2015 video games
Dance video games
Fitness games
Just Dance (video game series)
Kinect games
Music video games
PlayStation 3 games
PlayStation 4 games
PlayStation Move-compatible games
Ubisoft games
Video games developed in France
Video games developed in Italy
Wii games
Wii U eShop games
Wii U games
Xbox 360 games
Xbox One games